Marty Roth (born December 15, 1958) is a Canadian former race car driver who last competed in 2008 in the IndyCar Series where he owned his own team, Roth Racing.

Born in Toronto, Ontario, Canada, Roth was a successful land developer in the Toronto area before becoming involved in professional motorsports. He made starts in both the 2004 and 2005 Indy 500 races, as well as competing full-time in both of those seasons in the Indy Pro Series after acquiring the IPS assets of Panther Racing in 2003.

In April 2006, Roth sold his Pro Series equipment and announced that he would move up to the  IndyCar Series full-time, starting with the 2006 Indianapolis 500, however Roth failed to qualify for the 500 after crashing his car in practice late on Bump Day before achieving a qualifying run. He returned to the series at Michigan International Speedway in July and ran two more races at the end of the year. In 2007, he ran the Indy 500 and two previous races. Roth made 12 starts in the 2008 IndyCar Series season. In five other races he crashed (sometimes several times) and failed to start the race. At season's end, he was reportedly told by league management that his license would not be renewed for 2009 leaving his career in the series in doubt. Roth reportedly placed his team up for sale and later sold it to the new FAZZT Race Team.

Racing record

American open–wheel racing results
(key)

Indy Lights

Indy Pro Series

IndyCar Series

 1 Run on same day.
 2 Non-points paying, exhibition race.

Indianapolis 500

References

External links 

 
 

Living people
1958 births
Sportspeople from Toronto
Racing drivers from Ontario
Indianapolis 500 drivers
IndyCar Series drivers
IndyCar Series team owners
Indy Lights drivers